Saikumar Apoorva  (born 1981) also popularly known by her short name S. Apoorva also spelt as either S. Apoorwa or S. Appoorwa is an Indian carrom player and a defending carrom world champion in women's singles. She also currently works as a senior administrative officer in Life Insurance Corporation of India. She is also the first world champion in any sport to have emerged from the city of Hyderabad.

Early life 
She was born and raised in Hyderabad, Andhra Pradesh (now a part of it is called Telangana). Her ancestors hail from the state of Tamil Nadu. She took an interest in carrom as a child at the age of 10 after watching her father play the game with his friends. She pursued her career in the sport of carrom with her father's consultation.

Career 
She made her debut in 2003 at the International Carrom Federation Cup and won the women's singles title which was held in France. She won her maiden women's singles title at the 2004 Carrom World Championships which was held in Colombo.

S. Apoorva was also one of the key members of the Indian team which won the 2016 Carrom World Championship beating Sri Lanka in the final. She also won both women's singles and women's doubles with Kajal Kumari during the 2016 Carrom World Championship.

Appoorva was also part of the Indian team which thrashed Sri Lanka 3-0 in the final of the 2018 Carrom World Cup. In the 2018 Carrom World Cup, she also won the women's singles title defeating fellow Indian player Kajal Kumari in the final. She also emerged victorious in the women's singles at the 2019 Telangana State Ranking Tournament.

References 

1981 births
Living people
Indian carrom players
21st-century Indian women
21st-century Indian people